Thaddeus Lynch (1901 – 25 October 1966) was an Irish Fine Gael politician and auctioneer. He first stood for election at the 1952 Waterford by-election but was unsuccessful. He was elected as a Fine Gael Teachta Dála (TD) for the Waterford constituency at the 1954 general election. He was re-elected at each subsequent general election until his death in 1966. The by-election caused by his death was won by Fad Browne of Fianna Fáil.

In 1964, he proposed that boxwood cuttings from the U.S. state of Virginia be planted in the memorial park to honour John F. Kennedy then being planned for Wexford.

References

1901 births
1966 deaths
Fine Gael TDs
Members of the 15th Dáil
Members of the 16th Dáil
Members of the 17th Dáil
Members of the 18th Dáil
Politicians from County Waterford
Date of birth missing